Elias Brown (March 28, 1896 – December 25, 1937), born "Elias Bryant", and nicknamed "Country" or "Circus Country", was an American Negro league outfielder between 1918 and 1933.

A native of Atlanta, Georgia, Brown made his Negro leagues debut in 1918 for the Bacharach Giants, and also played briefly for the Hilldale Club and Lincoln Giants that season. He went on to enjoy a long professional career with several teams, and played in the 1926 Colored World Series for the Bacharach club. Brown died in New York, New York in 1937 at age 41.

References

External links
 and Baseball-Reference Black Baseball stats and Seamheads

1896 births
1937 deaths
Bacharach Giants players
Brooklyn Royal Giants players
Hilldale Club players
Lincoln Giants players
Washington Potomacs players
Wilmington Potomacs players
20th-century African-American sportspeople
Baseball outfielders